Garthwaite Stadium is a multi-sports venue in Conshohocken, Pennsylvania, in the USA. It has a capacity of 3,700 with its full name being the Albert A Garthwaite Stadium Field. The stadium is named for the former President of Lee Tire & Rubber Company.

In 2012 the stadium was fully renovated with upgrades to the stands, facilities and the floodlights. The stadium hosts the Conshohocken Music Festival and was used by Toronto Wolfpack rugby league team for their reality programme Last Tackle.

Philadelphia Phoenix 
The Philadelphia Phoenix, a professional ultimate team and member of the American Ultimate Disc League (AUDL), have played their home games at Garthwaite Stadium since 2014. In 2018 they boasted a 4-1-1 home record at Garthwaite.

Rugby League 

USA Rugby League club Philadelphia Fight play their home games at the stadium and the USA national rugby league team have also used the ground since 2011.

USA Rugby League International Matches 
USA points tally listed first.

USA Grand Finals

See also 

 List of rugby league stadiums by capacity

References 

Rugby league stadiums in the United States
Sports venues in Pennsylvania
United States national rugby league team
American National Rugby League
Rugby league in Pennsylvania